Filomena Tassi  is a Canadian politician who has served as the Minister responsible for the Federal Economic Development Agency for Southern Ontario since August 31, 2022. A member of the Liberal Party, Tassi represents the riding of Hamilton West—Ancaster—Dundas in the House of Commons, taking office following the 2015 federal election. She served as the Minister of Public Services and Procurement and Receiver General for Canada from 2021 to 2022, as the Minister of Labour from 2019 to 2021, and as the Minister of Seniors from 2018 to 2019.

Education and early career

She is of Italian descent, from the regions of Marche and Abruzzo, and raised Catholic. Tassi studied law at the University of Western Ontario, and then practised corporate law for six years. She subsequently left the legal profession and studied philosophy and religious education at the University of Waterloo, and began working as the chaplain at Bishop Tonnos Catholic Secondary School, a job she held until her election to the House of Commons.

Political career

Tassi's first run for elective office was as a candidate for the Ontario Liberal Party in the 1995 provincial election, where she finished a narrow second to NDP incumbent David Christopherson. Two decades later, she became the federal Liberal candidate in Hamilton during the 2015 federal election. Her candidacy attracted some media controversy, as she had made statements in the past suggesting that her Roman Catholic faith made her personally opposed to abortion, which seemingly put her in conflict with Liberal leader Justin Trudeau's requirement that all candidates agree to vote in favour of abortion rights. Trudeau clarified that Tassi had agreed to support the legal right to abortion.

Prior to entering federal politics, Tassi was a Catholic school board trustee.

After previously serving as Deputy Government Whip, Tassi was appointed to cabinet as Minister of Seniors on July 18, 2018, becoming the first minister responsible for the portfolio since 2015. After being re-elected in 2019, Tassi was named Minister of Labour, a job she held for just under two years until she was named Minister of Public Services and Procurement and Receiver General for Canada in the cabinet shuffle held following the 2021 federal election. Tassi served in that job until August 31, 2022, when she was named Minister responsible for the Federal Economic Development Agency for Southern Ontario, having requested to be moved to a portfolio with a lighter workload in order to deal with a family health matter.

Electoral record

Federal

Provincial

References

External links
 Official Website
 Bio & mandate from the Prime Minister
 

Living people
1962 births
Canadian people of Italian descent
Liberal Party of Canada MPs
Members of the 29th Canadian Ministry
Members of the House of Commons of Canada from Ontario
Members of the King's Privy Council for Canada
Women government ministers of Canada
Women members of the House of Commons of Canada
Politicians from Hamilton, Ontario
Canadian chaplains
Women Christian clergy
Canadian Christian clergy
Canadian Roman Catholics
Canadian women lawyers
Lawyers in Ontario
University of Waterloo alumni
University of Western Ontario alumni
Ontario Liberal Party candidates in Ontario provincial elections
Western Law School alumni
21st-century Canadian politicians
21st-century Canadian women politicians
People from Dundas, Ontario
Ontario school board trustees